Büdragchaagiin Dash-Yondon (also referred to as Dash-Yondon Büdragchaa, born February 17, 1946) is a Mongolian politician and former Chairman of Mongolian People's Revolutionary Party and Secretary General of Mongolian People's Revolutionary Party in 1991–1996. Also, he was an Extraordinary and Plenipotentiary Ambassador from Mongolia to the Republic of Bulgaria in 2001–2005.

Early life
Büdragchaagiin Dash-Yondon was born into a herding family in Tsetserleg soum, Khövsgöl Province on 17 February 1946, as the first child of Jügneegiin Büdragchaa and Sengiin Chogjmaa. He was raised with his thirteen siblings.

Education
He attended a secondary school in Mörön, Khövsgöl Province in 1954–1964. Then he was graduated from the History Faculty of National University of Mongolia as a history and philosophy teacher in 1968. Furthermore, he was graduated from Department of Philosophy of Taras Shevchenko National University of Kyiv in Ukraine with Ph.D in philosophy in 1978 studying there from 1974 to 1978.

Academic career
After graduation from the university, Dash-Yondon taught philosophy at the Faculty of Philosophy of the National University of Mongolia in 1968–1974. Since 2005 Dash-Yondon has been working as a scientific worker at the Institute of Philosophy, Psychology and Human Rights of the Mongolian Academy of Sciences.

Over the course of his academic career Dash-Yondon, wrote two monographs, three brochures, over 40 essays, and translated eight monographs of prominent philosophers and historians from Russian into Mongolian.

Political career
After earning Ph.D from Taras Shevchenko National University of Kyiv, Dash-Yondon was appointed as an inspector at the Department of Science and Education of Central Committee of Mongolian People's Revolutionary Party (MPRP) in 1978. In 1979–1985, he worked at the Institute of Politics under the Central Committee of MPRP as a pro-rector for scientific research and studies and head of the Department of Philosophy. In 1985–1990, he worked as a Deputy Director of the Department of Political Organization of the Central Committee of MPRP and then as a director of the department. He was elected and worked as a chairman of Committee of Ulaanbaatar City of MPRP in 1990–1991.

Dash-Yondon worked as a chairman of the Central Committee of MPRP (as the leader of MPRP) and a Secretary General of MPRP in 1991–1996. Following MPRP's defeat in 1996 Mongolian parliamentary election, he worked as the political adviser to the management board of MPRP in 1996. Immediately after his inauguration as Mongolian president, Natsagiin Bagabandi appointed Dash-Yondon as his political adviser. Dash-Yondon worked as a political advisor to the president of Mongolia and a chief coordinator of the Management Board for Religion and Temple Issues under the president of Mongolia in 1997–2001. Then he was appointed and served as an Extraordinary and Plenipotentiary Ambassador from Mongolia to Bulgaria in 2001–2005.

Awards
Dash-Yondon was awarded with the Order of Sukhbaatar, Red Banner of Labor, and Order of the Polar Star by the decrees of the President of Mongolia, and an Honored Worker of Science from Mongolian Academy of Sciences.

Marriage and family
Dash-Yondon married Choijamtsyn Batjargal in 1979. She was graduated from Moscow State University as a biochemist in 1970 and earned Ph.D in Chemical Science. They have four children: three daughters (one adopted) and one son. They are grandparents of five children.

References

1946 births
Living people
Ambassadors of Mongolia to Bulgaria
Mongolian expatriates in the Soviet Union
Mongolian People's Party politicians
National University of Mongolia alumni
Taras Shevchenko National University of Kyiv alumni
People from Khövsgöl Province